The 2022 season was the Michigan Panthers' first season as a professional American football franchise. They played as charter members of the United States Football League, one of eight teams to compete in the league for the 2022 season. The Panthers technically played as a traveling team due to them playing at Protective Stadium and Legion Field. The Panthers were led by head coach Jeff Fisher, who also operated as the de facto general manager.

Offseason

Draft

The 2022 USFL draft was conducted entirely on social media. Draft selections by the Michigan Panthers were announced on their social media. The Panthers selected former Michigan quarterback Shea Patterson first overall. The Panthers also selected former Broncos quarterback Paxton Lynch, a first round draft pick in the NFL, in the twelfth round. Another notable player selected was wide receiver Jeff Badet, who played alongside Oklahoma and future Browns quarterback Baker Mayfield in his Heisman Trophy season.

Supplemental draft

Free agency

Personnel

Final roster
The Panthers, like all other teams, have a 38-man active roster with a 7-man practice squad.

Staff

Schedule
The Panthers' 2022 schedule was announced on March 7. They opened the season against the Houston Gamblers.

Note: Intra-division opponents are in bold text. * mean that they host the game, since all eight teams play at the same stadium

Game summaries

Week 1: at Houston Gamblers

The Panthers started their season against the Houston Gamblers. The Gamblers scored the only points of the first quarter on a 37 yard field goal by Nick Vogel. In the first play of the second quarter, the Panthers were poised to score the first touchdown at 2nd & goal before a Shea Patterson fumble was returned 90 yards for a touchdown by Gamblers Reggie Northrop which, after a successful 2-point conversion, put the Panthers down 0–11. The Panthers forced a Gamblers 3 and out, and on the ensuing punt, returned the punt 40 yards for touchdown. However, an unnecessary roughness call on the Panthers negated the touchdown, putting them on their own 45 yard line. The Gamblers stretched out their lead with a 65 yard drive topped off by an Isaiah Zuber 12 yard touchdown reception, putting the Panthers down 0–17 after a failed 2-point conversion. 

The Panthers came out strong after halftime, driving 74 yards downfield for a touchdown. However, they missed the 2-point conversion, keeping the Panthers down 2 scores and a 6–17 deficit. They had a chance to put the game within 1 score with a 43 yard field goal, but it was missed. In the fourth quarter, the Panthers drove downfield 66 yards for the touchdown, which included a clutch 4th and 6. They again missed a 2-point conversion to put the game within 3. The Panthers had a chance to take the lead with 5:12 remaining in the 4th, but failed to convert a 4th and 26 with 0:09 remaining, and turned it over on downs to lose 12–17.

Week 2: at New Jersey Generals

The Panthers played against their division rival New Jersey Generals to open Week 2. The Generals struck first on a 21-yard field goal to put the Panthers down 0–3. In the second quarter, Panthers safety Orion Stewart intercepted Luis Perez and brought it back to the Generals 20 yard line. The Panthers capitalized, scoring a touchdown three plays later, putting the Panthers up 6–3. After trading punts, the Generals drove downfield that was capped off by a Darius Victor 1 yard rush, putting the Panthers down 6–10. 

The Panthers received the ball to start the second half. They drove downfield on a 15 play, 53 yard drive that ate up more than half the third quarter. On the Generals 21 yard line, the Panthers attempted a 39 yard field goal, but it was missed. In the fourth quarter, the Generals had a chance to go up 13–6, but they also missed a 34 yard field goal. Both teams failed to score in the fourth quarter, ending up in a 6–10 Panthers loss, dropping to 0–2.

Week 3: vs. Pittsburgh Maulers

The Panthers played against division rival Pittsburgh Maulers in week 3. The Panthers earned their first win with a 24–0 shutout against the Maulers. The Panthers scored two touchdowns in the first half, one coming off an opening drive touchdown capped off by a 2-point conversion to bring the Panthers to 8–0. After a muffed punt by the Maulers which set the Panthers up at the Maulers 5 yard line. Three plays later, starting quarterback Paxton Lynch rushed for 1 yard, bringing the Panthers to a 1 score lead at 16–0. 

The teams did not score for forty-six minutes. In the fourth quarter, the Panthers scored off a 63 yard touchdown drive with a successful 2-point conversion, bringing the score to 24–0 for the Panthers, which would be the final score.

Week 4: vs. Philadelphia Stars

The Panthers will play against division rival Philadelphia Stars.

Standings

Postseason
After the 2022 USFL season, the Panthers ended up with a 2–8 record, as they were able to get the 1st round pick and the 1st pick of every other round in the 2023 USFL Draft after beating 1–9 Pittsburgh Maulers on week 10. Michigan was eliminated from playoff contention after an 46–24 loss against the Philadelphia Stars.

Notes

References

Michigan
2022 in sports in Michigan
Michigan Panthers (2022)